Mundo Novo refers to the following places in Brazil:

 Mundo Novo, Goiás, municipality in Goiás
 Mundo Novo, Bahia, municipality in Bahia
 Mundo Novo, Mato Grosso do Sul, municipality in Mato Grosso do Sul